Novonikolsk is a rural locality (a selo) in Zheltoyarovsky Selsoviet of Svobodnensky District, Amur Oblast, Russia. The population is 55 as of 2018.

Geography 
The village is located 54 km north-east from Svobodny and 22 km from Zheltoyarovo.

References 

Rural localities in Svobodnensky District